Rockville may refer to:

Places

Australia 
Rockville, Queensland, a suburb in the city of Toowoomba

Canada 
Rockville, Nova Scotia
 Rockville, Ontario, a community in Northeastern Ontario

Iceland 
Rockville Air Station (Iceland), a former United States Air Force General Surveillance Radar station that operated from 1952 to 1992

New Zealand 
 Rockville, New Zealand, a rural community near Collingwood, New Zealand. Historically a dairy farming community.  Its local dairy factory is now the site of the Rockville Museum.

South Africa 
Rockville, Soweto, Gauteng

United States 
Rockville, Alabama
Rockville, California
Rockville, Connecticut
Rockville, Georgia
Rockville, Indiana, home of the Rockville Air Force Station, a former United States Air Force General Surveillance Radar station that operated from 1951 to 1966
Rockville, Iowa
Rockville, Maryland
Rockville (WMATA station), a subway station
Rockville Park Historic District
Rockville Pike (Maryland Route 355), a road in Montgomery County, Maryland
Rockville, Minnesota
Rockville, Missouri
Rockville, Nebraska
Rockville, Orange County, New York
Rockville Centre, New York, referred to as "Rockville"
Rockville, Ohio
Rockville, Pennsylvania
Rockville, Rhode Island
Rockville, South Carolina
Rockville, Utah
Rockville, Virginia
Rockville, West Virginia
Rockville, Wisconsin (disambiguation), multiple places
Welcome to Rockville, a rock festival in Florida

Entertainment 
"(Don't Go Back To) Rockville", commonly referred to as "Rockville", a song by rock group R.E.M. from their 1984 album Reckoning
Rockville (TV series), a South African television show

Other 

 USS Rockville, a vessel of the United States Navy

See also
 Rockville High School (disambiguation)
 Rockville Station (disambiguation)
 Rockville Township (disambiguation)